Inge Coeck (born 21 December 1965) is a Belgian sprint canoer who competed in the late 1980s. At the 1988 Summer Olympics in Seoul, she was eliminated in the semifinals of the K-1 500 m event.

References
Sports-Reference.com profile

1965 births
Belgian female canoeists
Canoeists at the 1988 Summer Olympics
Living people
Olympic canoeists of Belgium
20th-century Belgian women